was a renowned Japanese photographer.

References
Nihon shashinka jiten / 328 Outstanding Japanese Photographers. Kyoto: Tankōsha, 2000. .  Despite the English-language alternative title, all in Japanese.

External links
 Masaaki Nakagawa's site

Japanese photographers
1943 births
2005 deaths